Bahattin Sofuoğlu (1 January 1978 - 25 October 2002) born in Adapazarı, Turkey was a successful motorcycle racer for the Turkish Honda team. 

As the son of a motorcycle repairman, he started racing in 1997 at the age of nineteen. His two brothers Sinan and Kenan were also motorcycle racers. Sinan Sofuoğlu died on May 9, 2008, at the age of 25 in the intensive care unit of Kocaeli University Hospital following a motorcycle accident. He was training for the Turkey Motorcycle Championship at İzmit Körfez Circuit in Körfez, Kocaeli, where he fell-off his motorcycle and suffered a broken neck, trauma at the base of his skull, and pulmonary hemorrhage.

Achievements
 1999 Turkish Motorcycle Circuit Championship Supersport Class A champion
 2000 Turkish Motorcycle Circuit Championship Supersport Class A champion
 2001 Turkish Motorcycle Circuit Championship Supersport Class A champion

See also
 Sofuoğlu family

1978 births
2002 deaths
Sportspeople from Adapazarı
Turkish motorcycle racers
Road incident deaths in Turkey
Pedestrian road incident deaths
Bahattin